Eucalyptus castrensis, commonly known as Singleton mallee or Pokolbin mallee box, is a species of mallee that is endemic to a small area of New South Wales in eastern Australia. It has mostly smooth bark, lance-shaped adult leaves, flower buds in groups of seven, white flowers and cup-shaped fruit.

Description
It has smooth bronze-grey bark but older stems sometimes have a collar of rough bark near the base. Flowering has been observed in August and the flowers are white.

Taxonomy and naming
Eucalyptus castrensis was first formally described in 2002 by Ken Hill from a specimen collected on the Singleton Army Base and the description was published in the journal Telopea''''. The specific epithet (castrensis) is derived from the Latin word castra meaning "camp" with the suffix -ensis meaning "of" or "from", referring to the occurrence of this eucalypt in the grounds of an army base.

Distribution and habitat
Singleton mallee is only known from a single dense stand on an army base near Singleton where it grows on a low, broad sandstone ridge.

Conservation status
This eucalypt is listed as "endangered" under the New South Wales Government Biodiversity Conservation Act 2016''.

References

castrensis
Myrtales of Australia
Flora of New South Wales
Plants described in 2002